The Ambassador of Japan to Australia is an officer of the Japanese Ministry of Foreign Affairs and the head of the Embassy of Japan to the Commonwealth of Australia. The position has the rank and status of an Ambassador Extraordinary and Plenipotentiary and holds non-resident accreditation for Fiji and Papua New Guinea. The ambassador is based at the embassy at 112 Empire Circuit, Yarralumla in Canberra. The Ambassador is currently Shingo Yamagami.

Japan and Australia have enjoyed full diplomatic relations since 1941 when Tatsuo Kawai was appointed Envoy Extraordinary and Minister Plenipotentiary of Japan to Australia, although relations were severed after less than a year owing to the outbreak of the Pacific War in December 1941. Relations were restored in 1952 and have continued since then.

Office-holders

Minister

Ambassadors, 1952–present

See also
 List of Australian Ambassadors to Japan

References

External links
Embassy of Japan in Australia

 
Australia
Japan